The Harrodsburg Limestone is a geologic formation, a member of the Sanders Group of Indiana Limestone, of Mississippian age.  It was named for Harrodsburg in southern Monroe County, Indiana by T. C. Hopkins and C. E. Siebenthal ("The Bedford Oolitic Limestone of Indiana" - 1897). It is made up primarily of calcarenite and calcirudite. It also may include some beds of dolomite and shale.

Harrodsburg Limestone is found throughout the part of the Illinois Basin running through southern Indiana.

See also

 List of fossiliferous stratigraphic units in Indiana
 List of fossiliferous stratigraphic units in Kentucky

References

External links
Indiana Geological Survey explanation of Harrodsburg Limestone

Carboniferous Indiana
Carboniferous Kentucky
Carboniferous southern paleotropical deposits